Videntifier is an Icelandic software company which has developed a method to quickly identify videos and images automatically. Videntifier's patented technology can store the fingerprints of enormous amounts of video content and images, and can identify any of the reference material within seconds. Usually a single frame is enough to identify the entire video.

Currently, the company is headquartered in Reykjavik (Iceland) and has office in the Vilnius, Lithuania.

History
Videntifier Technologies was founded in September 2007 and provides technology to search and track vast amounts of multimedia data efficiently. Previously, the company has focused on providing services for police departments engaged in locating illegal images and videos on seized computers.

The company has its roots in the database laboratories of Reykjavík University and, later, it has opened a secondary lab in IRISA-CNRS, Rennes.

In 2005, Videntifier Technologies received one of the top prizes in the Austrian Genius competition for the "best business idea of 2008" and for the "innovation award 2008".

In 2008, Videntifier Technologies received the Golden Egg Award for the best new business idea in Iceland.

In 2013, Videntifier Technologies signed an agreement with the Interpol to provide advanced imaging technology in the effort against child sexual abuse material.

References

External links
Videntifier 

Companies based in Reykjavík
Computer security software companies
Software companies of Iceland
Icelandic brands